The Investigator Bank is a submerged bank or sunken atoll in the Union Territory of Lakshadweep, India.

Geography
It is located 31 km to the northeast of Minicoy Island in the southern region of the Nine Degree Channel. Its minimum depth is 217 m. Depths in the neighborhood of the bank reach 914 meters. The Investigator Canyon is located north of the Investigator Bank between 17˚45'N, 66˚27'E and 17˚47'N, 66˚10'E.
This bank was named in 1886 after wooden paddle hydrographic survey vessel HMS Investigator.

Image gallery

References

External links
Prostar Sailing Directions 2005 India & Bay of Bengal
Geographical information

Undersea banks of Lakshadweep
Reefs of India
Reefs of the Indian Ocean